Woodbridge High School is a public high school in unincorporated Sussex County, Delaware, with a Greenwood postal address. It is part of the Woodbridge School District. It has about 500 students who go by the name of the "Blue Raiders". The school colors are blue, grey, and white.

Communities served by the district include the majority of Bridgeville and all of Greenwood in Sussex County and all of Farmington in Kent County.

History
The school was formerly in the Bridgeville city limits. The district spent $52.5 million to build the current building, which opened in 2014.

Facility
The current facility has  of space and a capacity of 700 students. It has an 800-seat auditorium and a 1,100+-seat gymnasium.

References

External links
 
 School district website

High schools in Sussex County, Delaware
Public high schools in Delaware